Herod II (ca. 27 BC – 33/34 AD) was the son of Herod the Great and Mariamne II, the daughter of Simon Boethus the High Priest. For a brief period he was his father's heir apparent, but Herod I removed him from succession in his will. Some writers call him Herod Philip I (not to be confused with Philip the Tetrarch, whom some writers call "Herod Philip II").

Herod was the first husband of Herodias, and because both the Gospel of Matthew and Gospel of Mark state that Herodias was married to Philip, some scholars have argued that his name was actually Herod Philip. Because he was the grandson of the high priest Simon Boethus he is sometimes described as Herod Boethus, but there is no evidence he was actually thus called.

Life and marriage
Herod the Great's execution of his two sons born by his Hasmonean wife Mariamne, Alexander and Aristobulus IV in 7 BC, left the latter's daughter Herodias orphaned and a minor. Herod engaged her to Herod II, her half-uncle, and her connection to the Hasmonean bloodline supported her new husband's right to succeed his father.

As Josephus reports in Jewish Antiquities (Book XVIII, Chapter 5, 4):Herodias, [...], was married to Herod, the son of Herod the Great by Mariamne, the daughter of Simon the High Priest. [Herod II and Herodias] had a daughter, Salome...

This led to opposition to the marriage from Antipater II, Herod the Great's eldest son, and so Herod demoted Herod II to second in line to the succession. Antipater's execution in 4 BC for plotting to poison his father seemed to leave Herod II, now the eldest surviving son of Herod the Great, as first in line, but his mother's knowledge of the poison plot, and failure to stop it, led to his being dropped from this position in Herod I's will just days before he died. Herod II lived in Rome with Herodias as a private citizen and therefore survived his father's deathbed purges. Herod Antipas and his other remaining half-brothers shared Judaea amongst them.

Divorce
Herodias later married Herod II's half-brother, Herod Antipas. According to Josephus:
Herodias took upon her to confound the laws of our country, and divorced herself from her husband while he was alive, and was married to Herod Antipas

According to Matthew  and Luke , it was this proposed marriage that John the Baptist opposed. The Gospel of Matthew indicates that John was executed because he criticized this marriage. Nothing is known of Herod II after his divorce.

Notes

References

External links
 Herod Dynasty Family Tree

Herodian dynasty
27 BC births
33 deaths
1st-century monarchs in the Middle East
Roman client rulers
Herod the Great
1st-century BCE Jews
1st-century Jews
Heirs apparent who never acceded